Psychic Maps is the fifth studio album by American progressive metal band Dysrhythmia. The album was released through Relapse Records, on July 7, 2009.

Critical reception
Kerrang! gave the album a generally positive review. "Throughout the six tracks, there's richness of sound that throws a nod in the direction of Don Caballero, but they are capable of utterly kicking you arse when they want to with rushes of percussive violence and frantically mangled guitar, occasionally delving into the kind of assonance that makes your teeth hurt," reviewer Dan Slessor writes, giving it three K's out of five.

Track listing

Personnel
 Kevin Hufnagel – guitar
 Colin Marston – bass
 Jeff Eber – drums

References 

2009 albums
Dysrhythmia (band) albums
Relapse Records albums
Instrumental albums
Albums produced by Colin Marston